Maine is a 2018 American drama film written and directed by Matthew Brown and starring Laia Costa and Thomas Mann.

Cast
Laia Costa
Thomas Mann

Release
The film made its world premiere at the 2018 Tribeca Film Festival.  On October 9, 2018, it was announced that Orion Classics acquired North American and Latin American distribution rights to the film.

The film was released in theaters on December 13, 2018 and on VOD and digital platforms on December 14, 2018.

Reception
The film has  rating on Rotten Tomatoes.  Marshall Shaffer of Slash Film gave the film an eight out of ten.  David Ehrlich of IndieWire graded the film a C+. Sheri Linden of The Hollywood Reporter gave the film a positive review and wrote, "But as an immersion in the physical world and a very particular form of public solitude, Maine delivers."

The film was nominated for the Best Narrative Feature award at the 2018 Tribeca Film Festival.

References

External links
 
 

American drama films
2018 drama films
Orion Pictures films
2010s English-language films
2010s American films